Higgins Lake is a large recreational and fishing lake in Roscommon County, in the U.S. state of Michigan. It is named after Sylvester Higgins, the first chief of the topographical department of the Michigan Geological Survey. Its retention time is about 12.5 years. The lake's watershed covers 19,000 acres (77 km²). The twin-lobed lake receives half of its water from submerged springs, six percent from incoming streams, and the remainder from direct rainfall and runoff. It drains into Marl Lake by the Cut River which runs into Houghton Lake and eventually to Lake Michigan via the Muskegon River. A mile north of the lake, water flows into the Lake Huron watershed.

Sportfish in the lake include yellow perch, trout, smelt and pike.  Fish are taken both in open water and by ice fishing. Higgins Lake is considered a morphometrically oligotrophic lake, meaning that its large size causes it to appear and function as a nutrient-poor lake although it receives a fair amount of nutrients.

The unincorporated community of Higgins Lake is located along the western shores of the lake, and the lake is situated on the boundary between Lyon Township on the west and Gerrish Township on the east.

There are two state parks, located on opposite ends of the lake: South Higgins Lake State Park, which has a mile of shoreline, and North Higgins Lake State Park.  Both provide public boat launches and camping, and are very popular in the summer months. The south park is older, larger, and more developed. The north park is located on what was once the world's largest seedling nursery, a part of the CCC of the 1930s.

Centuries before European settlers came to North America, the Chippewa people called the lake Majinabeesh, which means 'sparkling water'.

History
The lake was first called Forginson Lake from an early 1839 survey by John Brink, but it was renamed Higgins Lake after Sylvester Higgins in an 1852 survey by William A. Burt.

Environmental concerns
In recent years, the lake has become increasingly popular as a residential and recreational area, which has raised concern for the lake's water quality.  Citizens and local government believe the lake suffers harm from increased loads of nutrients, including phosphorus and nitrogen, from septic systems, fertilizers, and runoff from roads.

The most obvious change has been the introduction of zebra mussels. Zebra mussels, which have no known predators in U.S. waters, threaten the existence of native clams and result in more vegetation growing on the bottom of the lake.

Residents at Higgins Lake have begun actively lobbying for laws to enforce cleaning of boats before they can be put into the lake, as well as programs to try to combat other foreign pests and intruders to preserve the lake's natural ecology.

Gallery

See also
List of lakes in Michigan

References

External links
  
Higgins Lake/Roscommon Chamber of Commerce

Lakes of Michigan
Bodies of water of Roscommon County, Michigan
Tourist attractions in Roscommon County, Michigan